The Reigning Monarchs are an American surf punk band from North Hollywood, Los Angeles, California, United States, formed in 2007 by guitarists Greg Behrendt and USA Mike Eisenstein. The current line-up includes bassist David Hawkins and drummer Blair Sinta. All songs are written and produced by Behrendt and Eisenstein, and The Monarchs have released a full-length LP and a split EP with Laramie Dean (also produced by Eisenstein).

On September 24, 2013, the band released their second album, Black Sweater Massacre, which was funded through a campaign on the crowd-sourcing website Indiegogo.

Their music is frequently used on Walking the Room, Behrendt’s podcast with Dave Anthony, and the band performs live at the show's "Starfish Circus" events. The Monarchs also play gigs independently throughout Southern California.

Discography
The Reigning Monarchs - (self-titled album) - 2009
 "Fanfare for the Well-Dressed Man" – 1:12
 "Short Pants for Fatty" – 2:13 
 "...And Then They Were Upon Us" – 2:45
 "Lambretta" – 2:40
 "Johnny Mac" – 2:41
 "The Duke" – 2:04
 "Thrown From a Rooftop Downtown" – 2:20
 "Mister Higgins" – 3:59
 "Fuel the Jets" – 2:47
 "Cuffed & Linked" – 3:44
 "True and Mighty" – 2:41
 "Spectre" – 3:18
 "Cowboy Shirt" – 2:35

"Split 7” with Laramie Dean" - 2010
 "Tijuana Snakefight" by The Reigning Monarchs – 2:46 
 "The Creeper" by Laramie Dean – 2:28

"All Summer Single" - 2012
 "All Summer Single" – 3:14
 "Lion & Bones" – 2:29
 "Attack Sweater Attack!" - 2:33

Black Sweater Massacre - 2013
 "It Might Be Perfect Right Now" – 1:13
 "Black Sweater Massacre" – 2:11
 "Murder Your Summer" - 2:19
 "Steakhouse" – 4:17
 "It's Always Going to Rain" – 2:25
 "Thuggery" - 1:49
 "Swamp Thing" – 3:38
 "Frankenstein Ska" – 5:52
 "Moto Guzzi" - 1:48
 "Roll the Tanks (Swea-ta up!)" – 2:35
 "Tanya Donelly" – 2:07
 "Blood Red Metalflake" - 2:44

References

Surf music groups
Punk rock groups from California
Rockabilly music groups
American ska musical groups
Musical groups from Los Angeles